Shamsiddin Asroridinovich Shanbiyev (born 18 February 1997) is a Russian football player of Tajik origin.

Club career
He made his debut in the Russian Football National League for FC Spartak-2 Moscow on 7 April 2016 in a game against FC Baltika Kaliningrad.

On 22 October 2018, he signed with FC Ural Yekaterinburg. As the transfer window was closed at the time, he was not eligible to play for Ural until 2019. On 19 January 2021, his Ural contract was terminated by mutual consent.

On 15 January 2021, he signed with Belarusian club FC Isloch Minsk Raion.

References

External links
 Profile by Russian Football National League
 

1997 births
People from Sughd Region
Tajikistani emigrants to Russia
Living people
Russian footballers
Association football midfielders
Russia youth international footballers
Russia under-21 international footballers
FC Spartak Moscow players
FC Spartak-2 Moscow players
FC Ural Yekaterinburg players
FC Isloch Minsk Raion players
FC Irtysh Omsk players
Russian First League players
Russian Second League players
Belarusian Premier League players
Russian expatriate footballers
Expatriate footballers in Belarus
Russian expatriate sportspeople in Belarus